The 2003 CSKA season was the club's twelfth season in the Russian Premier League, the highest tier of association football in Russia.

Squad

Transfers

Winter

In:

Out:

Summer

In:

Out:

Competitions

Super Cup

Premier League

Results by round

Results

Table

Russian Cup

2003-04

The Round of 16 2nd leg took place during the 2004 season.

Premier League Cup

UEFA Champions League

Qualifying rounds

Squad Statistics

Appearances and goals

|-
|colspan="16"|Players out on loan:

|-
|colspan="16"|Players who left CSKA Moscow during the season:
|}

Goal Scorers

Disciplinary Record

References

PFC CSKA Moscow seasons
CSKA Moscow
Russian football championship-winning seasons